Regional vocabulary within American English varies. Below is a list of lexical differences in vocabulary that are generally associated with a region. A term featured on a list may or may not be found throughout the region concerned, and may or may not be recognized by speakers outside that region. Some terms appear on more than one list.

Regionalisms 

Historically, a number of everyday words and expressions used to be characteristic of different dialect areas of the United States, especially the North, the Midland, and the South; many of these terms spread from their area of origin and came to be used throughout the nation. Today many people use these different words for the same object interchangeably, or to distinguish between variations of an object. Such traditional lexical variables include:

 faucet (North) and spigot (South)
 frying pan (North and South, but not Midland), spider (obsolete New England), and skillet (Midland and South)
 gutter (Northeast, South, and West), eaves trough (West and Inland North), and rainspouting (Maryland and Pennsylvania)
 pit (North) and seed (elsewhere)
 teeter-totter (North; widespread), seesaw (South and Midland; now widespread), and dandle (Rhode Island)
 firefly (more Northern and Western) and lightning bug (widespread)
 pail (North, north Midland) and bucket (Midland and South; now widespread)
sneakers (Northeast and fairly widespread), tennis shoes (widespread outside the Northeast) and gym shoes (Chicago and Cincinnati)
 soda (Northeast, Greater Milwaukee, Great St. Louis, California, and Florida), pop (Inland North, Upper Midwest, and Northwest), coke (South), and tonic (Eastern New England possibility)
 you guys (widespread), y'all (Southern and South Midland), you'uns and  yins (Western Pennsylvania), and yous or youse (New York City, Philadelphia, New Jersey, and Northeastern Pennsylvania)

However many differences still hold and mark boundaries between different dialect areas, as shown below. From 2000 to 2005, for instance, The Dialect Survey queried North American English speakers' usage of a variety of linguistic items, including vocabulary items that vary by region. These include:

 generic term for a sweetened carbonated beverage
 drink made with milk and ice cream
 long sandwich that contains cold cuts, lettuce, and so on
 rubber-soled shoes worn in physical education class, for athletic activities, etc.

Below are lists outlining regional vocabularies in the main dialect areas of the United States.

North 

 brat or braht – bratwurst
 breezeway (widespread) ("skyway" in Minnesota) – a hallway connecting two buildings
 clout (originally Chicago, now widespread) – political or social influence
 davenport (widespread though uncommon) – a sofa, or couch
 euchre (throughout the North) – card game similar to spades
 fridge (throughout North and West) – refrigerator
 hotdish (esp. Minnesota) – a simple entree cooked in a single dish, related to casserole
 paczki (in Polish settlement areas, esp. Illinois, Michigan, Ohio and Wisconsin) – a jelly doughnut
 pop (North-Central and West) – a soft drink, carbonated soda
 soda (all the Northeast and parts of Wisconsin) – soft drink
 Troll (North-Central) – people who reside in the Lower Peninsula of Michigan
 Yooper (North-Central) – people who reside in the Upper Peninsula of Michigan
ope – a form of alert or apology used when trying to get around someone or something; E.g. "Ope, let me squeeze right past ya". Ope is most often used in Wisconsin, Michigan, Illinois, and Minnesota.

Northeast 

 brook (now widespread but especially common in the Northeast) – creek 
 bubbler (esp. New England, Wisconsin and the Mississippi and Ohio river valleys) – a water fountain
 cellar – alternate term for basement
 sneakers (throughout the U.S., though concentrated in the Northeast and parts of Florida) – generic rubber-soled athletic shoe.
 soda – a sweet, carbonated soft drink
 Mischief Night (or, rarer, Cabbage Night) – an annual night when, by custom, preteens and teenagers play pranks; usually, the night before Halloween

New England 

 grinder – submarine sandwich
 packie (package store) – a liquor store
 rotary – traffic circle
 tag sale – garage sale
 wicked (all of Massachusetts) – very; an intensifier and adverb, as in wicked cold meaning very cold

Eastern New England 

 bulkhead – cellar hatchway
 cabinet (Rhode Island) – milk shake
 frappe – milkshake
 hosey – (rare, but esp. parts of Massachusetts & Maine) to stake a claim or choose sides, to claim ownership of something (sometimes, the front seat of a car)
 intervale – bottomland; mostly historical
 jimmies – sprinkles (ice cream topping) see also Mid-Atlantic, below
 johnnycake (also Rhode Island jonnycake) – a type of cornmeal bread
 leaf peeper – a tourist who has come to see the area's vibrant autumn foliage
 necessary – outhouse, privy
 quahog – pronounced "koe-hog," it properly refers to a specific species of clam but is also applied to any clam
 tonic (eastern Massachusetts) – soft drink

Northern New England 

 ayuh –  "yes" or affirmative
 creemee – (Vermont) soft serve ice cream 
 dooryard – area around the main entry door of a house, specifically a farmhouse. Typically including the driveway and parking area proximal to the house
 Italian (sandwich) – (Maine) submarine sandwich
 logan (also pokelogan) –  a shallow, swampy lake or pond (from Algonquian)
 muckle – to grasp, hold-fast, or tear into
 mud season – early spring

Mid-Atlantic 

 breezeway – the space between two groups of rowhouses in the middle of a city block
 down the shore – shore areas and beaches of Southern New Jersey
 hoagie – submarine sandwich
 jawn – pronoun used for any person, place, or thing
 jimmies – sprinkles (ice cream topping) see also New England, above
 parlor – living room
 pavement – sidewalk
 shoobie – A visitor to the beach (typically the South Jersey shore) for the day (as contrasted with an overnight visitor)
 water ice – Italian ice
 yo! – Hello; also used to grab someone's attention
 youze – plural form of "you people"

Greater New York City 

 bodega – small corner grocery store, from the Spanish word for closet
 catty corner –  on an angle to a corner
 dungarees (older) – jeans
 egg cream – a mixture of cold milk, flavored syrup, and seltzer
 have a catch – play catch
 hero – submarine sandwich
 kill – a small river or strait, in the name of specific watercourses; e.g. Beaver Kill, Fresh Kills, Kill Van Kull, Arthur Kill (from Dutch)
 on line – waiting or standing in a line
 potsy – hopscotch
 punchball and stickball – street variants of baseball, suitable for smaller urban areas, in which a fist or stick substitutes for the bat and a "Spaldeen" is the ball
 scallion – spring onion
 stoop – a small porch or steps in front of a building, originally from Dutch

Midland 

 barn-burner (now widespread) – an exciting, often high-scoring game, esp. a basketball game
 hoosier (esp. Indiana) – someone from Indiana; (outside of Indiana, esp. in the St. Louis, Missouri area) a person from a rural area, comparable to redneck
 mango – green bell pepper, sometimes also various chili peppers
 outer road – a frontage road or other service road
A soft drink is generally known in the American Midland as pop, except for being soda around Greater St. Louis in Missouri and Illinois, and coke in central Indiana and central and western Oklahoma

South 

 alligator pear – avocado
 banquette (southern Louisiana) – sidewalk, foot-path
 billfold (widespread, but infrequent Northeast, Pacific Northwest) – a man's wallet
 cap (also Midlands) – sir (prob. from "captain")
 chill bumps (also Midlands) – goose bumps
 chuck – toss or throw an object (now somewhat widespread)
 coke – any brand of soft drink
 commode (also Midlands) – bathroom; restroom; particularly the toilet itself
 crocus sack (Atlantic), croker sack (Gulf) – burlap bag
 cut on/off – to turn on/off
 directly – in a minute; soon; presently
 dirty rice (esp. Louisiana) – Cajun rice dish consisting of rice, spices, and meat
 Don't get above your raisin'  -  regional colloquialism 
 fais-dodo (southern Louisiana) – a party
 fix – to get ready, to be on the verge of doing, e.g. "I'm fixing to go"; (widespread but esp. South) to prepare food
 house shoes – bedroom slippers
 lagniappe (Gulf, esp. Louisiana) – a little bit of something extra
 locker (esp. Louisiana) – closet
 make (age) (Gulf, esp. Louisiana)  – have a birthday; "He's making 16 tomorrow."
 neutral ground (Louisiana, Mississippi) – median strip
 po' boy (scattered, but esp. South)  – a long sandwich, typically made with fried oysters, clams, or shrimp
 put up – put away, put back in its place
 yankee – northerner; also damn yankee, damned yankee
 yonder (esp. rural) – over there, or a long distance away; also over yonder

West 

 barrow pit (var. of "borrow pit") - an excavated area where material has been dug for use as fill at another location
 davenport (widespread) – couch or sofa
 hella or hecka (esp. San Francisco Bay Area) – "very" or "a lot of" 
 pop (widespread in West and North); soda (predominates in California, Arizona, southern Nevada); coke (in parts of New Mexico and Tucson, Arizona) – sweetened carbonated beverage
 snowmachine (Alaska) – a motor vehicle for travel over snow. Outside Alaska known as a snowmobile

Pacific Northwest 

 skid road or skid row – a path made of logs or timbers along which logs are pulled; (widespread) a run-down, impoverished urban area

See also
American and British English differences section Vocabulary
General American
List of dialects of the English language
Names for soft drinks in the United States
Sociolinguistics

Notes

References

External links 
 
NY Times dialect quiz
 

 R

American
American English
Shibboleths